Senzeni Marasela (11 February 1977) is a South African visual artist born in Thokoza who works across different media, combining performance, photography, video, prints, textiles and embroidery in mixed-medium installations. She obtained a BA in Fine Arts at the Wits School of Arts, University of the Witwatersrand, Johannesburg in 1998. Her work is exhibited in South Africa, Europe and the United States, and part of local and international collections, including Museum of Modern Art or the Newark Museum and is referenced in numerous academic papers, theses journal and book publications.

Work
Marasela's work explores the experiences of black South African women across a range of media, including photography, video, prints, and mixed-medium installations involving textiles and embroidery. In her work, she translates memories of struggle and urbanization through the use of material culture and narratives, such as the use of the colour red which refers to cultural memories around the time of the "Red Dust" which refers to a period of drought in the early 1930s in South Africa. Her performances interweave these elements and multi-media works, making visible the dimension of the everyday through objects and clothes. She is known for her six-year performance work Ijermani Lam which "materialises the condition of waiting" by wearing the same red dress every day from the 1st of October 2013 to the 1st of October 2019. The original dresses were part of the group the exhibition "Made Visible. Contemporary South African Fashion and Identity" at the Museum of Fine Arts in Boston (February–May 2019). Her work taps into cultural memories using printing archival materials such as newspapers and photographs on colonial textiles. It tells stories of black women in South Africa, such as Sarah Baartman or her mother Theodorah Mpofukazi Marasela through series such as Covering Sarah Baartman (2011), Sarah, Senzeni and Theodorah come to Joburg (2011), Theodorah, (2005), Waiting for Gebane (2017), Izithombe Zendawo Esizithandayo (2017) and builds an "intimate archive", giving voice to experiences of Black women.

Early career 
Senzeni Marasela went to St Dominic's School for Girls in Boksburg where she matriculated in 1994. Her mother's collection of doilies and Victorian lace works which were handed down in her family over generations influenced her artistic practice. During a one-day trip in 1992 to the University of the Witwatersrand  she decided to enroll there. She developed her multimedia and performative practice at the Wits School of Arts where she graduated in 1998.

Career 
Marasela's work is regularly shown since the Martienssen Prize Exhibition in 1997. She was taken up by the Goodman Gallery after being part of the group exhibition Not Quite a Christmas Exhibition. She had a first solo exhibition at the Iziko South African National Gallery's Fresh exhibition series in 2000 which was part of a residency programme. In 2003, she started a long-term performance entitled Theodorah comes to Johannesburg in which is based on stories her mother told about her 11-hour travel from Mvenyane to Johannesburg.(ref)

In 2011 Marasela decided to work as a full-time artist and was part of the Johannesburg Pavilion at 56th Venice Biennale in 2015.

Exhibitions 

2018

Senzeni Marasela, Waiting for Gebane. Dolly Parton, Toffee Gallery, Darling, South Africa

2011

Sarah, Theodora and Senzeni in Johannesburg. Art On Paper, Johannesburg, South Africa

2010

Senzeni Marasela. Beyond Booty: Covering Sarah Baartman and other Tales. Axis Gallery, New York and New Jersey in association with submerged art, USA

2009

Witness. Art on Paper, Johannesburg, South Africa

Oh my God you look like shit. Who let you out of the house looking like that?,  Solo performance, Sternersen Museum, Oslo, Norway

JONGA – Look at Me! A Museum of Women, Dolls and Memories. Devon Arts residency, Devon, Scotland

2005

Theodorah and Other Women. Art on Paper, Johannesburg, South Africa

2004

Three Women, Three Voices. Johannesburg Art Gallery, Johannesburg, South Africa

2002

Upstream Public Art Project. Amsterdam, the Netherlands

2000

Fresh. South African National Gallery, Cape Town, South Africa

Group Exhibitions

2019

I am… Contemporary Women Artists of Africa. Smithsonian National African Museum, Washington, USA

2018 – 2019

Soft Power. Transpalette, Bourges, France

2018

1:54 Contemporary African Art Fair. AFRONOVA, Somerset House, London, UK

Ravelled Threads. Sean Kelly Gallery, New York, USA

1:54 Contemporary African Art Fair. AFRONOVA, Pioneer Works, New York, USA

Investec Cape Town Art Fair. Cape Town International Convention Centre, Cape Town, South Africa

2017

Africa. Raccontare un Mondo. PAC, Milan, Italy

1:54 Contemporary African Art Fair. AFRONOVA, Pioneer Works, New York, USA

2016

1:54 Contemporary African Art Fair. AFRONOVA, Somerset House, London, UK

KIN, HANGAR. Centro de Investigação Artística, Lisbon, Portugal

2014

Ik Beem Afrikander. Johannesburg, South Africa

Contemporary South African Art Exhibition. Yale University, New Haven, USA

Nomad Bodies. Royal Academy of Fine Art, Antwerp, Belgium – Fried Contemporary, Pretoria, South Africa

2013

Weather Report. University of Potchefstroom, North-West Province, South Africa

Africa curating Africa. ABSA Contemporary, Johannesburg, South Africa, (Travelling Exhibition)

2012

Ongoing. Present Tense: Arts of Contemporary Africa. Newark Museum, New Jersey, USA

Red. 5 Pieces Gallery, Berne, Switzerland

ME1. Fried Contemporary, Pretoria, South Africa

2011

New traditions: Louise McCagg & Senzeni Marasela. Collaboration at A.I.R. Gallery, in Association with Axis Gallery and Alma-on-Dobbin, New York, USA

Impressions from South Africa: Printed Art/1965 to Now. The Paul J. Sachs Prints and Illustrated Books Galleries, MoMA, New York, USA

2010 – 2013

Translations into Jewellery. Everard Read Gallery, Johannesburg, South Africa – Standard Bank Gallery, Johannesburg, South Africa

2009 – 2011

DARKROOM: South African Photography and New Media 1950 – Present. Virginia Museum of Fine Art, Richmond, USA – Birmingham Museum of Art, Alabama, USA

2009

Dystopia. Unisa Art Gallery,  Pretoria, South Africa – Museum Africa, Johannesburg, South Africa – Oliewenhuis Art Museum, Mangaung, Bloemfontein, South Africa – Jan Colle Galerij, Ghent, Belgium.

Beauty and Pleasure. The Stenersen Museum, Oslo, Norway

Unbounded: New Art for a New Century. Newark Museum, New Jersey, USA

Developing Democracy: A New Focus on South African Photography. Kyle Kauffman, Gallery, New York, USA

2008

Thami Mnyele and Medu Art Ensemble Retrospective Exhibition, Johannesburg Art Gallery, Johannesburg, South Africa

Black Womanwood: Icons, Images and Ideologies of the African Body. Hood Museum of Art, Dartmouth College, Hanover, USA- Davis Museum and Cultural Center, Wellesley College, Wellesley, USA – San Diego Museum of Art, San Diego, USA

2007

Jive Soweto. Hector Petersen Museum, Soweto, South Africa

2006

Ranjith Kally, Senzeni Marasela and Ruth Seopedi Motau at Goodman Gallery

2006

Erase Me from Who I Am. Las Palmas, Canary Islands, Spain

2005

Click.  Goodman Gallery, Johannesburg, South Africa

2004

Ten Voices, Ten Years of Democracy. Public Art project of the City of Rome, Italy

Public Private. Auckland Public Gallery, Auckland, New Zealand

2003

The Body and the Archive. Artists' Space, New York, USA

2002

Aids in Africa. Wellesley College, Wellesley, USA

2001

Sample E.C. Gertrude Posel Gallery, University of the Witwatersrand, Johannesburg, South Africa

Open House Exhibition. Umea Art Academy, Umea, Sweden

2000

Margins in the Mainstream. Namibian National Gallery, Windhoek, Namibia

Translation/Seduction/Displacement: Post-Conceptual and Photographic Work. South African Artists, White Box, New York, USA

Portrait Afrika. Haus der Kulturen Der Welt, Berlin, Germany

Art Region End of Africa. Listafen Reykjavikur Kjarvalsstadir, Reyjavik, Iceland

1999

Market Photo Workshop Exhibition. Rembrandt van Rijn Gallery, Johannesburg, South Africa

Postcards from South Africa. Axis Gallery, Johannesburg, South Africa

Truth Veils. Getrude Posel Gallery, Johannesburg, South Africa

1998

Family Ties. Sandton Civic Gallery, Johannesburg, South Africa

Democracy's Images. Bildmusset, Umea, Sweden

Women's Voices. Mercedes Benz Museum, Stuttgart, Germany

1997

Not Quite a Christmas Exhibition. Goodman Gallery, Johannesburg, South Africa

Martienseen Prize Exhibition. Gertrude Posel Gallery, Johannesburg, South Africa

Biennales

2005

Beijing Biennale, South African Representative, Beijing, China

References 

20th-century South African women artists
20th-century South African artists
South African women artists
South African artists
South African women painters
1977 births
Living people